Sadaf Asgari (Persian: صدف عسگری, born ) is an Iranian actress. She is best known for her acting in Disappearance (2017), Yalda, a Night for Forgiveness (2019) and Squad of Girls (2022). She won the Short Film Special Jury Award for Acting at the 2020 Sundance Film Festival for her performance in Exam (2019).

Filmography

Film

Awards and nominations

See also 
 Iranian women
 Iranian cinema
 Fajr International Film Festival

References

External links 

 

1997 births
Living people
People from Tehran
Actresses from Tehran
Iranian film actresses
21st-century Iranian actresses
Sundance Film Festival award winners